Imperial Army (HRE) may refer to:
Imperial Army (Holy Roman Empire)
Army of the Holy Roman Empire